First Federal Bank may refer to:
First Federal Bank of California
First Federal Bank of the Midwest